Malcolm Muir (October 20, 1914 – July 22, 2011) was a United States district judge of the United States District Court for the Middle District of Pennsylvania.

Education and career

Born in Englewood, New Jersey, Muir received a Bachelor of Arts degree from Lehigh University in 1935 and a Bachelor of Laws from Harvard Law School in 1938. He was in private practice in Williamsport, Pennsylvania,  from 1938 to 1942. He served in the United States Navy during World War II, from 1942 to 1945, achieving the rank of lieutenant. Afterwards he returned to private practice in Williamsport until 1970.

Federal judicial service

On September 28, 1970, Muir was nominated by President Richard Nixon to a new seat on the United States District Court for the Middle District of Pennsylvania created by 84 Stat. 294. He was confirmed by the United States Senate on October 8, 1970, and received his commission six days later. He assumed senior status on August 31, 1984, serving in that status until his death.

Dwyer case

Muir presided over the trial of R. Budd Dwyer, the then Treasurer of Pennsylvania who was convicted in December 1986 of 11 counts of conspiracy, mail fraud, perjury and interstate transportation in aid of racketeering; Dwyer was scheduled to be sentenced by Muir on those charges on January 23, 1987. Dwyer scheduled a press conference for the day before, January 22, where after stating his innocence, he killed himself in front of the gathered members of the media and his staff. He faced a possible sentence of up to 55 years' imprisonment and a $300,000 fine.

Death

On July 22, 2011, Muir died in Williamsport, Pennsylvania at the age of 96.

References

Sources
 

1914 births
2011 deaths
People from Englewood, New Jersey
People from Williamsport, Pennsylvania
Lehigh University alumni
Harvard Law School alumni
Judges of the United States District Court for the Middle District of Pennsylvania
United States district court judges appointed by Richard Nixon
20th-century American judges
United States Navy officers
United States Navy personnel of World War II
Military personnel from Pennsylvania